Mangelia biondi is an extinct species of sea snail, a marine gastropod mollusk in the family Mangeliidae.

Description
The length of the shell attains 5 mm,.

Distribution
This extinct marine species was found in Pliocene strata of Lombardy, Italy.

References

 Bellardi L. (1877). I molluschi dei terreni terziarii del Piemonte edella Liguria. Parte II.  Memorie della Reale Accademia delle Scienze di Torino, serie 2, 29: 1-373

External links
 Worldwide Mollusc Species Data Base : Mangelia biondi

biondi
Gastropods described in 1877